Piala Tun Sharifah Rodziah is a women's football tournament in Malaysia. It was established in 1976 as a women's football competition competed by the teams around Malaysia. The competition is managed by the Football Association of Malaysia (FAM).

History 
A women's football competition has been held in Malaysia since 1960. The inaugural season was competed by four teams from Perak, Selangor, Negeri Sembilan and Malacca. A competition trophy was only introduced in 1961, contributed by the Straits Times.

Women Football Association of Malaysia (PBWM) was officially registered in December 1974, and the first president was the Tun Sharifah Rodziah. A proper tournament was officially held in 1976 when PBWM introduced the women's football tournament, the Piala Tun Sharifah Rodziah. A new trophy was contributed by the Tunku Abdul Rahman for the inaugural tournament season. The cup format followed the Piala Malaysia format that year, and a home and away match was introduced for the tournament. A total of eight teams compete: Johor, Melaka, Negeri Sembilan, Selangor, Pahang, Perak, Penang and Singapore.

The cup was held on a consistent basis until 2004, and was then not held for 11 years. It made a comeback in 2015 for the 28th edition. A total of ten teams participated in the revival season of the tournament. The 2015 season was won by MISC-MIFA. In 2016, MISC-MIFA defended their championship by winning the cup for the second time.

12 teams participated in the 2017 edition of the tournament where the teams were divided into two groups. The winner goes to Sarawak.

In 2018, the tournament was participate by 8 teams and still using a group format. The final match was won by Kedah for the first time since their club participate in this tournament by defeat Melaka with 2 goal in 90min time.

Teams 
Below is the list of teams competing in the tournament by year.

2022 

  Penang
  SSM Pahang
  Sabah
  Melaka (Champion)
  Negeri Sembilan
  Sarawak
  Selangor
  Kelantan

2019 

 ATM
  Kedah
  Kelantan
  Melaka (Champion)
  PDRM
  Perak
  Selangor

2018 

 ATM
  Kedah (Champion)
  Melaka
  Negeri Sembilan
  PBMM
  Penang
  Sabah
  Selangor

2017 

  MISC-MIFA
  Sabah
  Sarawak (Champion)
  Melaka (debut)
  Perak
  Pahang
  Negeri Sembilan
  Penang
  PDRM
  Selangor
  Kelantan (debut)
  Kedah

2016 

  Perlis
  Kedah
  Penang
  Perak
  Selangor
  Kuala Lumpur
  Negeri Sembilan
  Pahang
  Sabah
  Sarawak
  MISC-MIFA (Champion)
  ATM

Champions 
Below is the list of champions since the cup was first held in 1976.

Performance by clubs

References

External links 
 

Football cup competitions in Malaysia
Women's football in Malaysia